Ocnus is a genus of sea cucumbers in the family Cucumariidae.

Species
The following species are recognised in the genus Ocnus:
Ocnus amiculus Cherbonnier, 1988
Ocnus braziliensis (Verrill, 1868)
Ocnus brunneus (Forbes in Thompson, 1840)
Ocnus capensis (Théel, 1886)
Ocnus cataphractus (Sluiter, 1901)
Ocnus corbulus (Cherbonnier, 1953)
Ocnus cruciformis Thandar in Thandar & Mjobo, 2014
Ocnus cylindricus Semper, 1867
Ocnus diomedeae Pawson, 1976
Ocnus glacialis (Ljungman, 1879)
Ocnus lacteus (Forbes & Goodsir, 1839)
Ocnus paracorbulus Thandar, Zettler & Arumugam, 2010
Ocnus petiti (Cherbonnier, 1958)
Ocnus placominutus Thandar, Zettler & Arumugam, 2010
Ocnus planci (Brandt, 1835)
Ocnus pygmaeus Semper, 1867
Ocnus rowei Thandar, 2008
Ocnus tantulus Cherbonnier, 1988
Ocnus vicarius Bell, 1883

References

Cucumariidae
Holothuroidea genera